Milk Lake may refer to:

 Milk Lake, Taiwan, a lake in Taiwan
 Milk Lake, the lake that occupies the place of the former Milk Lake Glacier in Washington, US
 Milchseen, or "Milk Lakes" within the Spronser Lakes group in South Tyrol, Italy
 Sutgol or "Milk lake" of Turkish mythology
 Lichiqucha, a mountain and lake in the Peruvian Andes
 Lichiqucha (Chicla-Yauli), a mountain and lake in the Peruvian Andes
 Milk lakes, a term for the milk surplus bought by the EU as a result of its Common Agricultural Policy